The 2020 Seattle Storm season was the franchise's 21st season in the Women's National Basketball Association (WNBA). The regular season was originally scheduled to tip off at home versus the Dallas Wings on May 15, 2020. However, the beginning of the 2020 WNBA schedule was delayed due to the COVID-19 pandemic.  The shortened season tipped off on July 25, 2020, versus the New York Liberty.

Due to ongoing renovations at Climate Pledge Arena the Storm will continue to split time between the Alaska Airlines Arena and the Angel of the Winds Arena.

This WNBA season would have featured an all-time high 36 regular-season games. However, the plan for expanded games was put on hold on April 3, when the WNBA postponed its season due to the COVID-19 pandemic. Under a plan approved on June 15, the league was scheduled to hold a shortened 22-game regular season at IMG Academy, without fans present, starting on July 24.  Gary Kloppenburg was named the interim head coach for the year, when Dan Huges announced he would sit out the season due to COVID-19 concerns.

The Storm got off to a hot start, winning their first two games before losing to last' years champions Washington.  They then went on a nine-game winning streak, and their record sat at 10–1 halfway through the season.  The winning streak was ended by a two-game losing streak, just after the halfway mark of the season.  The Storm then rallied for seven straight wins and were 18–3 entering the final game of the regular season.  They faced off against the 17–4 Las Vegas Aces.  With a win, the Storm could secure the first seed in the playoffs.  A loss, would mean the Storm would be the second seed via tie-breaker rules.  The Aces prevailed 86–84, and the Storm ended up as the second seed.

As the second seed, the Storm received a double-bye into the Semifinals and would play the higher remaining seed.  They faced off against the fourth seed Minnesota Lynx.  The Storm swept the series three games to none.  The first game was a close one, with the Storm winning by two points, but they won the second two games by double digits to advance to the finals.  In the finals, they faced off against the Aces again.  The Storm again swept the series, three games to none.  No game was very close, with the Storm winning the first two games by thirteen, and the third game by thirty three points.  The Storm won their fourth WNBA Championship.

Transactions

WNBA Draft

Trades and roster changes

Roster

Game log

Regular season

|- style="background:#bbffbb;"
| 1
| July 25
| New York Liberty
| W 87–71
| Stewart (18)
| Stewart (8)
| Bird (5)
| IMG Academy0
| 1–0
|- style="background:#bbffbb;"
| 2
| July 28
| Minnesota Lynx
| W 90–66
| Stewart (18)
| Stewart (10)
| Loyd (6)
| IMG Academy0
| 2–0
|- style="background:#fcc;"
| 3
| July 30
| Washington Mystics
| L 71–89
| Stewart (15)
| Stewart (10)
| Clark (4)
| IMG Academy0
| 2–1

|- style="background:#bbffbb;"
| 4
| August 1
| Los Angeles Sparks
| W 81–75
| Stewart (21)
| Stewart (9)
| Clark (6)
| IMG Academy0
| 3–1
|- style="background:#bbffbb;"
| 5
| August 4
| Connecticut Sun
| W 87–74
| Stewart (22)
| Howard (6)
| Canada (6)
| IMG Academy0
| 4–1
|- style="background:#bbffbb;"
| 6
| August 6
| Atlanta Dream
| W 93–92
| Stewart (27)
| Stewart (8)
| Canada (6)
| IMG Academy0
| 5–1
|- style="background:#bbffbb;"
| 7
| August 8
| Phoenix Mercury
| W 74–68
| Loyd (20)
| Howard (10)
| Canada (10)
| IMG Academy0
| 6–1
|- style="background:#bbffbb;"
| 8
| August 10
| Chicago Sky
| W 89–71
| Stewart (25)
| Howard (7)
| Stewart (7)
| IMG Academy0
| 7–1
|- style="background:#bbffbb;"
| 9
| August 12
| Atlanta Dream
| W 100–63
| Tied (20)
| Stewart (9)
| Canada (10)
| IMG Academy0
| 8–1
|- style="background:#bbffbb;"
| 10
| August 14
| Dallas Wings
| W 83–65
| Stewart (21)
| Howard (8)
| Bird (5)
| IMG Academy0
| 9–1
|- style="background:#bbffbb;"
| 11
| August 16
| Connecticut Sun
| W 95–72
| Stewart (19)
| Howard (11)
| Loyd (5)
| IMG Academy0
| 10–1
|- style="background:#bbffbb;"
| 12
| August 18
| New York Liberty
| W 105–64
| Prince (16)
| Howard (11)
| Bird (7)
| IMG Academy0
| 11–1
|- style="background:#fcc;"
| 13
| August 20
| Indiana Fever
| L 84–90
| Loyd (35)
| 3 tied (5)
| Canada (6)
| IMG Academy0
| 11–2
|- style="background:#fcc;"
| 14
| August 22
| Las Vegas Aces
| L 74–82
| Stewart (29)
| Stewart (18)
| Canada (7)
| IMG Academy0
| 11–3
|- style="background:#bbffbb;"
| 15
| August 25
| Indiana Fever
| W 87–74
| Stewart (27)
| Tied (9)
| Canada (5)
| IMG Academy0
| 12–3
|- style="background:#bbffbb;"
| 16
| August 29
| Chicago Sky
| W 88–74
| Stewart (21)
| Howard (15)
| Canada (9)
| IMG Academy0
| 13–3

|- style="background:#bbffbb;"
| 17
| September 2
| Washington Mystics
| W 71–64
| Stewart (16)
| Stewart (14)
| Canada (5)
| IMG Academy0
| 14–3
|- style="background:#bbffbb;"
| 18
| September 4
| Los Angeles Sparks
| W 90–89
| Loyd (25)
| Stewart (8)
| Stewart (9)
| IMG Academy0
| 15–3
|- style="background:#bbffbb;"
| 19
| September 6
| Minnesota Lynx
| W 103–88
| Howard (19)
| Clark (5)
| Tied (7)
| IMG Academy0
| 16–3
|- style="background:#bbffbb;"
| 20
| September 9
| Dallas Wings
| W 107–95
| Tied (23)
| Stewart (11)
| Bird (9)
| IMG Academy0
| 17–3
|- style="background:#bbffbb;"
| 21
| September 11
| Phoenix Mercury
| W 80–63
| Canada (13)
| Tied (7)
| Loyd (5)
| IMG Academy0
| 18–3
|- style="background:#fcc;"
| 22
| September 13
| Las Vegas Aces
| L 84–86
| Loyd (30)
| Russell (11)
| Canada (5)
| IMG Academy0
| 18–4

Playoffs 

|- style="background:#bbffbb;"
| 1
| September 22
| Minnesota Lynx
| W 88–86
| Loyd (25)
| Stewart (10)
| Bird (8)
| IMG Academy
| 1–0
|- style="background:#bbffbb;"
| 2
| September 24
| Minnesota Lynx
| W 89–79
| Loyd (20)
| Stewart (8)
| Stewart (7)
| IMG Academy
| 2–0
|- style="background:#bbffbb;"
| 3
| September 27
| Minnesota Lynx
| W 92–71
| Stewart (31)
| Clark (9)
| Bird (9)
| IMG Academy
| 3–0

|- style="background:#bbffbb;"
| 1
| October 2
| Las Vegas Aces
| W 93–80
| Stewart (37)
| Stewart (15)
| Bird (16)
| IMG Academy
| 1–0
|- style="background:#bbffbb;"
| 2
| October 4
| Las Vegas Aces
| W 104–91
| Stewart (22)
| Howard (8)
| Bird (10)
| IMG Academy
| 2–0
|- style="background:#bbffbb;"
| 3
| October 6
| Las Vegas Aces
| W 92–59
| Stewart (26)
| Loyd (9)
| Bird (7)
| IMG Academy
| 3–0

Standings

Playoffs

Statistics

Regular season

Awards and honors

References

External links 
 Official website of the Seattle Storm

Seattle Storm
Seattle Storm seasons
Seattle Storm
Seattle Storm
Women's National Basketball Association championship seasons